The Dragon Ball Collectible Card Game (Dragon Ball CCG) is a collectible card game based on the Dragon Ball franchise, first published by Bandai on July 18, 2008.

The game features exclusive artwork from all  anime series (Dragon Ball, Z and GT. The game has similarities to the other CCG created by Bandai, the Naruto Collectible Card Game.

Card Types and Rarity

The original release of the game includes four different types of cards: warrior, technique, event, and wish.

Warrior cards are the characters who fight in the game, such as Goku, Gohan, Piccolo, Vegeta, Frieza, and Cell These cards are the core of the game, they will determine whether the player wins or loses the match.

Technique cards are various attacks that can be used by the warriors in play against the opponent's warriors in battle, such as the Kamehameha, Spirit Bomb or Final Flash.  Technique cards are single use, once a warrior uses a technique, it goes to the player's chi area.

Various events in the series are also used in the game to change the dynamics of a battle. These card stay in the game unless removed by a card effect or the event card has a "time limit".

The wish cards are cards based on wishes made in the series that can be used when the seven Dragon Balls are collected. A player can only wish once per game unless a card effect over rides this game rule.

There were different types of cards by rarity: Each booster pack includes 9 randomly selected cards (6 common, 2 uncommon, 1 rare). Within these 9 card packs 1 parallel holographic card is randomly inserted (1 guaranteed foil card of any rarity) and a Gold foil card (super rare) is inserted in a 1:6 pack ratio.

Styles
The game features 5 different styles of cards: Super, Earth, Alien, Unique (mostly Namekian), and Villain.

Super:Predominantly Z Warriors and their supporters.
Earth: Humans and Earthlings.
Alien: Things not from Earth, Bad and Good.
Villain: Antagonists from Earth.
Unique: Antagonists and protagonists from the franchise.

Sets

Warriors Return

First released on 18 July 2008. Warriors Return is the first set released of the game in the United States. The set includes 113 cards and is based on only the Dragon Ball and Dragon Ball Z series. A 10-card booster pack includes 1 holographic foil card, 1 gold-stamped rare, 2 uncommon, 6 common and in every 1 in 8 packs, a super rare foil card replaces the holographic foil card. The set has seen a 1st Edition and an unlimited print run.

The Awakening

The Awakening is the second set released by Bandai. It features 100 brand new cards that include more powerful versions of the characters from the first set, like additional Super Saiyans and the only super Namekian card ever printed in the game. There are no starter decks in this set but includes the same 10-pack boosters with the same type of cards. It was released on 17 October 2008.

Destructive Fury
Released early 2009, Destructive Fury contains 109 new cards, with more transformation conclusions, such as Cell (The Complete Form) and Mecha Frieza, and is the first set to feature cards from Dragon Ball GT. The only release ever to see a Super Saiyan 3 (Goku) printed in this game. The power level of the game has significantly risen with the release of the cards in this set and even a few promo cards were released with the introduction of Destructive Fury.

Fusion

101 new cards released in 2009. The only edition to include Wish cards released in an official set. Fusion introduces the new mechanic called “fusion” and the fusion deck. Under the new mechanic, two specific warriors can fuse into one warrior, whose card is placed into the fusion deck at the beginning of a game.

Clash of Sagas
The final release of the game as it stands, with 102 cards released in 2009. A huge jump can be observed in the power level of cards included in this set. The release of dual chi symbol and dual chi cost cards have helped to smooth out the gameplay for decks built including multiple colours. Additional fusion warriors, including “Gogeta” have been printed. Numerous cards have been released that increase the power level of previous deck archetypes, such as “Namekian Fusion”, “Pain and Power” or “King Cold”. The only super rare event card has been released here. New keyword mechanics like “Expert” or “Backup” have been introduced.

Starter Decks

The Warriors Return Starter Decks

There are two starter decks (Goku - starter Deck B and Frieza - starter deck A) with 30 cards each including super rare cards not found in booster packs and one of four special wish cards. Cards exclusive to these starter decks are:
 
•	Captured
•	Combination
•	Emperor Pilaf’s Wish
•	Frieza – WA 048
•	Frieza (The 3rd Form)
•	Frieza’s Henchmen
•	Frieza’s Last Wish
•	Goku – WA 046
•	Krillin – WA 047
•	Oolong’s Wish
•	Power of the Instinct
•	Upa’s Wish

Promotional Cards

There are only two cards officially released with the promo set description at the bottom left corner. These being “Goku” PR-01 and “Z Warriors Gather” PR-02. However, a number of other cards have been released under specific sets are also considered promotional.

The Warriors Return Promo Cards

A small set of chibi cards have been released, showcasing the most iconic characters’ first appearance in Dragon Ball:
 
•	Goku
•	Krillin
•	Master Roshi
•	Bulma

Destructive Fury Promo Cards

In early 2009, with the release of the third set Destructive Fury, Bandai released a small number of promotional cards technically as part of the set, in an attempt to draw in additional players:
 
•	Dynamic Mess Em Up Punch
•	Enormous Fighting Aura
•	Exposure
•	Gohan – WA 140
•	Great Saiyaman – WA 141
•	Mecha Frieza
•	Special Fighting Pose
•	Vegeta – WA 142
 
It is hypothesised that these promo cards were originally intended for a starter deck which was never released.

Game Mats

Numerous Game mats have been released for the game:
•	The Warriors Return Goku super rare art 
•	The Awakening Gohan (Super Saiyan) super rare art 
•	Destructive Fury Trunks (Super Saiyan) super rare art 
•	Destructive Fury Mecha Frieza art

Rule Books

A printed booklet, version 1.1  is included with every Goku and Frieza starter set when purchased unopened. An updated rule book, version 1.3 was released with the Clash of Sagas set release and was mainly distributed in pdf format. In the latter version the rules were revised and all the additional changes have been included, due to the large amount of new mechanics being introduced in Clash of Sagas.

Dragon Ball Super Card Game
Dragon Ball Super Card Game is a completely unrelated game.

Super Sets

Core Sets

Base Series

BT1 Galactic Battle 
Galactic Battle is the first set of cards in this version of the card game. This set was designed to function as a core set for the game. 
The set released on July 28, 2017 and consists of 114 cards (60 Commons, 30 Uncommons, 12 Rares, 8 Super Rares and 4 Special Rares).

BT2 Union Force 
Union Force is the second set for the Dragon Ball Super card game and focuses on the new Union mechanics. This set primarily focuses on the Future Trunks arc, Android/Cell saga, the Majin Buu saga, Cooler's Revenge and The Return of Cooler, and characters from the Tournament of Power arc. 
The set released on November 3, 2017 and consists of 127 cards (60 Commons, 30 Uncommons, 18 Rares, 14 Super Rares, 4 Special Rares and 1 Secret Rare).

BT3 Cross Worlds 
Cross Worlds is the third set for the Dragon Ball Super card game. It introduces Black cards as the fifth color in the game. It also adds characters from Dragon Ball GT as well as more character from the Universe Survival arc from Dragon Ball Super. The Black cards are mostly focusing on characters from Dragon Ball Xenoverse and utilize the new Over Realm mechanic, that sends cards to the "Warp" a new out of play area. 
The set released on March 9, 2018 and consists of 127 cards (60 Commons, 30 Uncommons, 18 Rares, 14 Super Rares, 4 Special Rares and 1 Secret Rare). 217 types total with foil version cards.

BT4 Colossal Warfare 
Colossal Warfare is the fourth set for the Dragon Ball Super card game. It introduces the bond, swap and deflect mechanics. 
The set released on July 13, 2018 and consists of 128 cards (60 Commons, 30 Uncommons, 18 Rares, 14 Super Rares, 4 Special Rares and 2 Secret Rares). 218 types total with foil version cards.

BT5 Miraculous Revival 
Miraculous Revival is the fifth set for the Dragon Ball Super card game. It introduces wish leaders, revolving around using dragon balls to grant effects once per game, as well as once per turn smaller scale abilities. 
The set released on November 9, 2018 and consists of 131 cards (60 Commons, 30 Uncommons, 18 Rares, 11 Super Rares, 11 Special Rares and 1 Secret Rare). 221 types total with foil version cards.

BT6 Destroyer Kings 
Destroyer Kings is the sixth set for the Dragon Ball Super card game. It focuses on the Broly movie released earlier in the year and introduces Destroyer Rare cards.
The set released on March 15, 2019 and consists of 137 cards (60 Commons, 30 Uncommons, 18 Rares, 11 Super Rares, 11 Special Rares, 2 Secret Rares and 5 Destruction Rares). 227 types total with foil version cards.

BT7 Assault of the Saiyans 
Assault of the Saiyans is the seventh set for the Dragon Ball Super card game. It focuses on Saiyan cards, from the Saiyan saga in the original Dragon Ball Z series.
The set released on August 2, 2019 and consists of 145 cards (60 Commons, 30 Uncommons, 18 Rares, 16 Super Rares, 10 Special Rares, 2 Secret Rares, 5 Infinite Sayan Rares and 4 Signature Special Rares). 235 types total with foil version cards.

BT8 Malicious Machinations 
Malicious Machinations is the eighth set for the Dragon Ball Super card game.
The set released on November 22, 2019 and consists of 147 cards (60 Commons, 30 Uncommons, 18 Rares, 16 Super Rares, 10 Special Rares, 3 Secret Rares, 5 Noble Hero Rares and 5 Ignoble Villain Rares). 237 types total with foil version cards.

BT9 Universal Onslaught 
Universal Onslaught is the ninth set for the Dragon Ball Super card game.
The set released on February 14, 2020 and consists of 147 cards (60 Commons, 30 Uncommons, 18 Rares, 16 Super Rares, 10 Special Rares, 3 Secret Rares, 5 Reboot Leader Rares and 5 Iconic Attack Rares). 237 types total with foil version cards.

Unison Warrior Series

BT10 Rise of the Unison Warrior 
Rise of the Unison Warrior is the tenth set for the Dragon Ball Super card game, first of the Unison Warrior block.
The set will be released on July 17, 2020 and consists of 164 cards (60 Commons, 38 Uncommons, 30 Rares, 23 Super Rares, 10 Special Rares and 3 Secret Rares). 292 types total with foil version cards.

BT11 Vermilion Bloodline 
Vermilion Bloodline is the eleventh set for the Dragon Ball Super card game, second of the Unison Warrior block.
The set will be released on October 9, 2020 and consists of 292 cards (60 Commons, 38 Uncommons, 30 Rares, 23 Super Rares, 10 Special Rares and 3 Secret Rares). 292 types total with foil version cards.

BT12 Vicious Rejuvenation 
Vicious Rejuvenation is the twelfth set for the Dragon Ball Super card game, third of the Unison Warrior block.
The set will be released on January 22, 2021 and consists of 292 cards (60 Commons, 38 Uncommons, 30 Rares, 23 Super Rares, 10 Special Rares and 3 Secret Rares). 292 types total with foil version cards.

BT13 Supreme Rivalry 
Supreme Rivalry is the thirteenth set for the Dragon Ball Super card game, fourth of the Unison Warrior block.
The set will be released April 2021 and consists of 292 cards (60 Commons, 38 Uncommons, 30 Rares, 23 Super Rares, 10 Special Rares and 3 Secret Rares). 292 types total with foil version cards.

BT14 Cross Spirits 
Cross Spirits is the fourteenth set for the Dragon Ball Super card game, fifth of the Unison Warrior block.
The set will be released August 13, 2021 and consists of 292 cards (60 Commons, 38 Uncommons, 30 Rares, 23 Super Rares, 10 Special Rares and 3 Secret Rares). 292 types total with foil version cards.

BT15 Saiyan Showdown 
Saiyan Showdown is the fifteenth set for the Dragon Ball Super card game, sixth of the Unison Warrior block.
The set will be released November 5, 2021 and consists of 292 cards (60 Commons, 38 Uncommons, 30 Rares, 23 Super Rares, 9 Special Rares and 4 Secret Rares). 292 types total with foil version cards.

BT16 Realm of the Gods 
Realm of the Gods is the sixteenth set for the Dragon Ball Super card game, seventh of the Unison Warrior block.
The set will be released March 11, 2022 and consists of 292 cards (60 Commons, 38 Uncommons, 30 Rares, 18 Super Rares, 14 Special Rares, 3 Secret Rares and 1 God Rare). 292 types total with foil version cards.

BT17 Ultimate Squad 
Ultimate Squad is the seventeenth set for the Dragon Ball Super card game, eighth of the Unison Warrior block.
The set released on June 3, 2022 consists of 292 cards (60 Commons, 38 Uncommons, 30 Rares, 18 Super Rares, 15 Special Rares and 3 Secret Rares). 292 types total with foil version cards.

ZENKAI Series

BT18 Dawn of The Z-Legends 
Dawn of The Z-Legends is the eighteenth set for the Dragon Ball Super card game, first of the Zenkai series.
The set will be released September 16, 2022 and consists of 292 cards (60 Commons, 38 Uncommons, 30 Rares, 18 Super Rares, 14 Special Rares, 3 Secret Rares and 1 God Rare). 292 types total with foil version cards.

BT19 Fighter's Ambition 
Fighter's Ambition is the nineteenth set for the Dragon Ball Super card game, second of the Zenkai series.
The set will be released November 25, 2022 and consists of 292 cards (60 Commons, 38 Uncommons, 30 Rares, 18 Super Rares, 10 Special Rares, 3 Secret Rares and 5 Campaign Rares). 292 types total with foil version cards.

BT20 Power Absorbed 
Power Absorbed is the twentieth set for the Dragon Ball Super card game, third of the Zenkai series.
The set will be released March, 2023 and consists of 292 cards (60 Commons, 38 Uncommons, 30 Rares, 18 Super Rares, 15 Special Rares and 3 Secret Rares). 292 types total with foil version cards.

Themed Sets 
List of Themed Sets:
 TB1 The Tournament of Power. Focused on the Tournament of Power in Dragon Ball Super. Released on May 25, 2018.
 TB2 World Martial Arts Tournament. Focused on WMAT. Released on September 21, 2018.
 TB3 Clash of Fates. Focused on the legendary Frieza Saga. Released on January 18, 2019.

Draft Sets
List of Draft Sets:
 DB 04 Dragon Brawl. Released on September 20, 2019.
 DB 05 Divine Multiverse. Released on March 27, 2020.
 DB 06 Giant Force. Released on November 13, 2020

Expansion Sets
List of Expansion Sets: 
 EX01 Expansion Set: Mighty Heroes
 EX02 Expansion Set: Dark Demon's Villains
 EX03 Expansion Set: Ultimate Box
 EX04 Expansion Set: Unity of Saiyans
 EX05 Expansion Set: Unity of Destruction
 EX07 Expansion Set: Magnificent Collection Fusion Hero
 EX08 Expansion Set: Magnificent Collection Forsaken Warrior
 EX09 Expansion Set: Saiyan Surge
 EX10 Expansion Set: Namekian Surge
 EX11 Expansion Set: Universe 7 Unison
 EX12 Expansion Set: Universe 11 Unison
EX14 Expansion Set: Battle Advanced
EX15 Expansion Set: Battle Enhanced

Special Anniversary Boxes
 SP01 Special Anniversary Box
 SP02 Special Anniversary Box 2020

Other
 Vault Power Up Pack
 Gift Box
 Gift Box 2: Battle of Gods Set
 Gift Box 3: Wild for Revenge Set

Decks

Starter Decks
Starter Deck includes 50 cards and 1 Leader card as a deck style to start the game, 1 play sheet and 1 play manual. Includes 5 starter deck-exclusive cards (except starter deck 8 which has 10 starter deck-exclusive cards) and also (except starter decks 10,11,12,13,14,15 and 16 which has 6 starter deck-exclusive cards)!

List of Starter Decks:
 SD1 Starter Deck: The Awakening
 SD2 Starter Deck: The Extreme Evolution
 SD3 Starter Deck: The Dark Invasion
 SD4 Starter Deck: The Guardian of Namekians
 SD5 Starter Deck: The Crimson Saiyan
 SD6 Starter Deck: Resurrected Fusion
 SD7 Starter Deck: Shenron's Advent
 SD8 Starter Deck: Rising Broly
 SD9 Starter Deck: Saiyan Legacy
 SD10 Starter Deck: Parasitic Overlord
 SD11 Starter Deck: Instinct Surpassed
 SD12 Starter Deck: Spirit of Potara
 SD13 Starter Deck: Clan Collusion
 SD14 Starter Deck: Saiyan Wonder
 SD15 Starter Deck: Pride Of The Saiyans
 SD16 Reboot Starter Deck: Darkness Reborn

Expert Decks
Expert Deck includes 50 cards and 1 Leader card as a deck style to start the game, 1 play sheet and 1 play manual (only the first) and a booster pack. Includes 10 expert deck-exclusive cards!

List of Expert Decks:
 XD1 Expert Deck: Universe 6 Assailants
 XD2 Expert Deck: Android Duality
 XD3 Expert Deck: The Ultimate Life Form

Ultimate Decks
Ultimate Deck includes 50 cards and 1 Leader card as a deck style to start the game and a booster pack. Includes  ultimate deck-exclusive cards!

List of Ultimate Decks:
 UD1 Ultimate Deck

List of decks:
 SD1 Starter Deck: The Awakening
 SD8 Starter Deck: Rising Broly
 SD10 Starter Deck: Parasitic Overlord
 XD2 Expert Deck: Android Duality
 SD11 Starter Deck: Instinct Surpassed
 XD3 Expert Deck: The Ultimate Life Form

List of decks (2):
 SD2 Starter Deck: The Extreme Evolution
 SD3 Starter Deck: The Dark Invasion
 SD4 Starter Deck: The Guardian of Namekians
 SD5 Starter Deck: The Crimson Saiyan
 SD6 Starter Deck: Resurrected Fusion
 SD7 Starter Deck: Shenron's Advent
 SD9 Starter Deck: Saiyan Legacy
 XD1 Expert Deck: Universe 6 Assailants
 SD12 Starter Deck: Spirit of Potara
 SD13 Starter Deck: Clan Collusion
 SD14 Starter Deck: Saiyan Wonder
 SD15 Starter Deck: Pride Of The Saiyans
 SD16 Reboot Starter Deck: Darkness Reborn

See also
Carddass

References

External links
 https://web.archive.org/web/20090202051600/http://bandaicg.com/
Official DBS TCG

Dragon Ball Collectible Card Game
Card games introduced in 2008
Card games introduced in 2017
Collectible Card Game